The Public Order and Security Act (POSA) is a piece of legislation introduced in Zimbabwe in 2002 by a ZANU-PF dominated parliament. The act was amended in 2007. Jonathan Moyo is reported as having been one of the chief architects of the act, an accusation that he denies, citing the fact he has never held office in the relevant ministry (law and order legislations come from the Ministry of Home Affairs). The other co accused in the crafting of the law is Emmerson Mnangagwa.

Many regard POSA as an act that helped Robert Mugabe consolidate his power. The law gave untold powers to the police, the Zimbabwe Republic Police (ZRP). It is still under debate in the new term of rule and it is inarguably an unfair plot against human rights.

POSA has since been applied against demonstrations by the government. On August 1, 2018 the law was invoked, resulting in the army fatally shooting protesters against alleged rigging of the Zimbabwean general election, 2018.

References 

Law of Zimbabwe
Zimbabwean legislation
2002 in Zimbabwe
2002 in law